Moderato may refer to:

 Moderato, an Italian musical term; see Glossary of music terminology#M
 Moderato Wisintainer (1902-1986), Brazilian footballer generally known as Moderato

See also
 Moderato Cantabile, a 1958 novel by Marguerite Duras